Yamphu language  is a Kirati language spoken by the Kirat Yamphu people, a Kirati people of the Himalayas of Nepal. Tomyang (Chongka) is a recently discovered dialect spoken by only 20 people. Both it and Yamphe are distinct. Southern Yamphu is also considered to be Southern Kirat Lorung language. These varieties are all closely related.

Geographical distribution
Yamphu is spoken in the following locations of Nepal:
Sankhuwasabha District, Kosi Zone: Hedangna, Num, Seduwa, Peppuwa, Mangsimma, Karmarang, Tungkhaling, Uwa, Ala, Uling, and Walung villages
Matsya Pokhari VDC, located in the upper Arun River valley in the Eastern hills; extreme north Lorung area, directly southwest of the Jaljale Mountains
Bhojpur District, Kosi Zone
Ilam district: Fikkal, Kolbung, Panchakanya, Jitpur, Danabari, Mahamai (VDCs)].
 Jhapa district, Morang and Sunsari 
 Darijiling, Sikkim, Silong, Meghalaya, Misoram, Barma, Bhutan and Thailand (Officially recorded)
 However, Yamphu are dispersed all over the world including USA, Europe, South America, Africa and other continent of the world.

References

Sources
 Rutgers, Roland (1998). Yamphu: Grammar, Texts & Lexicon. Leiden: Research School CNWS. – 

Kiranti languages
Languages of Nepal
Languages of Koshi Province